Bosaso Airport , also known as Bosaso International Airport, is an airport in Somalia. It sits at 11°16′32″N 49°9′0″E on the outer edge of the city of Bosaso, the commercial capital of the northeastern Puntland macro-region and adjacent to the Gulf of Aden. It is the second largest airport in the country after the Aden Adde International Airport in Mogadishu,

History
Construction of the Bosaso International Airport started in 2007. Funds for the project were initially supplied by United Arab Emirates-based financiers.

In 2008, the Puntland government signed a multi-million US dollar deal with Dubai's Lootah Group, a regional industrial organization operating in the Middle East and Africa. According to the agreement, the first phase of the investment is worth Dhs 170m and would see a set of new companies established to operate, manage and build Bosaso's free trade zone and sea and airport facilities. The Bosaso Airport Company was also slated to develop the airport complex to meet international standards, including a new 3.4 km runway, main and auxiliary buildings, taxi and apron areas, and security perimeters.

Following the 2008 Puntland presidential elections, airport renovations came to a standstill as greater focus was placed on activities in the regional capital of Garowe.

In 2012, a Product-Sharing Agreement signed between the Puntland government and the Australian oil company Range Resources earmarked $5 million USD for the construction of an airport runway. Renovations subsequently resumed, with a bricklaying ceremony for the new runway held in November of the year at the Bosaso International Airport. The event was attended by various Puntland government officials and businesspeople, including Bosaso Mayor Hassan Abdallah Hassan, Bari region Governor Abdisamad Gallan, and Ministry of Aviation official Saida Hussein Ali.

In late September 2013, a launching ceremony of tender process for the Bosaso airport's renovations was held at the facility. The event was attended by Puntland government and aviation officials as well as representatives of around 20 international companies, with over 24 firms vying for the project. The tender is slated to be closed in mid-October. According to Puntland Deputy Minister of Civil Aviation Abdiqani Gelle, the winner of the tender process is then scheduled to mobilize its operation within a two-month period. The airport renovations are being overseen by the Puntland government, with the Italian authorities funding the project through UNOPS. It will include the extension of the Bosaso airport's gravel runway from 1,800 m to 2,650 m. The runway's width will also be widened from 30 m to 45 m, and feature 7.5 m gravel shoulders on both sides. According to Gelle, the Puntland government plans to carry out similar upgrades at the Garowe, Galkayo and Qardho airports.

In December 2014, the foundation stone for a new runway was laid at the airport. The inauguration event was attended by cabinet ministers, legislators, traditional leaders, and various international officials, including tender winner China Civil Engineering Construction Corporation, financial partner and Ambassador of Italy to Somalia Farbizio Marcelli, and United Nations Office for Project Services representatives. The China Civil Engineering Construction Corporation is now slated to upgrade the airport's existing gravel runway, pave it with asphalt, and convert it from 1.8 km to 2.65 km in accordance with the code 4C operations clause.

On 8 January 2016, The renovated and modernized Bosaso Airport was officially reopened, the reopening event attended by President of the federal republic of Somalia Hassan Sheikh Mohamud, Puntland president Abdiweli Mohamed Ali federal and regional ministers, Mayor of Bosaso Yasin Mire Mohamud, the constructor CCECC, Italian Ambassador, and other distinguished guests and foreign envoys as well as Traditional elders include Ugas Hassan Ugas Yasin.

Airlines and destinations

Accidents and incidents

See also
Aden Adde International Airport
Hargeisa International Airport
Abdullahi Yusuf International Airport
Burao Airport
Kismayo Airport
Berbera Airport
List of airports in Somalia

References

External links
 

Airports in Somalia
Bosaso